Thomas Balogh, Baron Balogh (2 November 190520 January 1985), born Balog Tamás, was a British economist and member of the House of Lords.

The elder son of a wealthy Budapest Jewish family (his father was head of public transport, his mother the daughter of a professor), Balogh studied at the city Gymnasium, considered 'the Eton of Hungarian youth', then at the universities of Budapest and Berlin. He took a two-year research position at Harvard University as a Rockefeller Fellow in 1928. Following this, Balogh worked in banking in Paris, Berlin and Washington before coming to England.

After getting British citizenship in 1938, he became a lecturer at Balliol College, Oxford, and was elected to a Fellowship in 1945, then became Reader in 1960. He was also the economic correspondent for the New Statesman, an economic adviser to Harold Wilson's Cabinet office following the 1964 Labour Party victory, and member of the Secretariat of the League of Nations.

As an advisor in the Cabinet Office after 1964, Balogh was a critic of consumption- and profit-orientated tax policies, arguing that "profit can be earned not merely by satisfying long felt wants more efficiently and in a better fashion, but also by creating new wants through artificially engendered satisfaction and the suggestion of status symbols", instead arguing that nationalisation was a better means of securing wage restraint and a more equitable tax system as a whole. Balogh was opposed to Britain's entry of the EEC.

Balogh was created a Life Peer as Baron Balogh, "of Hampstead in Greater London" on 20 June 1968.

He was married twice: firstly in 1945 to Penelope Noel Mary Ingram Tower (daughter of Rev. Henry Bernard Tower, Vicar of Swinbrook, Oxfordshire, and widow of Oliver Gatty, a Balliol Fellow, by whom she had a daughter, Tirril), a psychotherapist, with whom he had two sons and a daughter; secondly in 1970 to Catherine (née Cole, previously married to Anthony Storr), a psychiatrist and author.

Major works
 The Dollar Crisis (1949)
 The Economics of Poverty (1970)
 The Irrelevance of Conventional Economics (1982)

Biographies
 The Life and Times of Thomas Balogh: A Macaw Among Mandarins, June Morris (Sussex Academic Press, 2007).

References

1905 births
1985 deaths
20th-century British economists
Academics of the London School of Economics
Fellows of Balliol College, Oxford
20th-century Hungarian economists
Members of the Hungarian Academy of Sciences
Balogh, Thomas Balogh, Baron
Chairs of the Fabian Society
Hungarian emigrants to the United Kingdom
Life peers created by Elizabeth II